A plate, usually called anode in Britain,  is a type of electrode that forms part of a vacuum tube. It is usually made of sheet metal, connected to a wire which passes through the glass envelope of the tube to a terminal in the base of the tube, where it is connected to the external circuit.  The plate is given a positive potential, and its function is to attract and capture the electrons emitted by the cathode.  Although it is sometimes a flat plate, it is more often in the shape of a cylinder or flat open-ended box surrounding the other electrodes.

Construction
The plate must dissipate heat created when the electrons hit it with a high velocity after being accelerated by the voltage between the plate and cathode.   Most of the waste power used in a vacuum tube is dissipated as heat by the plate.  In low power tubes it is usually given a black coating, and often has "fins" to help it radiate heat.  In power vacuum tubes used in radio transmitters, it is often made of a refractory metal like molybdenum. and is part of a large heat sink that projects through the glass or ceramic tube envelope and is cooled by radiation cooling, forced air or water.

Secondary emission
A problem in early vacuum tubes was secondary emission; electrons striking the plate could knock other electrons out of the metal surface.  In some tubes such as tetrodes these secondary electrons could be absorbed by other electrodes such as grids in the tube, resulting in a current out of the plate.  This current could cause the plate circuit to have negative resistance, which could cause unwanted parasitic oscillations.  To prevent this most plates in modern tubes are given a chemical coating which reduces secondary emission.

See also
 Anode

External links
https://web.archive.org/web/20101007201649/http://pentalabs.com/tubeworks.html – The history of vacuum tubes
The Thermionic Detector – HJ van der Bijl (October 1919)
How vacuum tubes really work – Thermionic emission and vacuum tube theory, using introductory college-level mathematics.
The Vacuum Tube FAQ – FAQ from rec.audio
 The invention of the thermionic valve. Fleming discovers the thermionic (or oscillation) valve, or 'diode'.

References

Shiers, George, "The First Electron Tube", Scientific American, March 1969, p. 104.
Tyne, Gerald,  Saga of the Vacuum Tube, Ziff Publishing, 1943,  (reprint 1994 Prompt Publications), p. 30–83.
RCA Radiotron Designer's Handbook, 1953 (4th Edition). Contains chapters on the design and application of receiving tubes.

Vacuum tubes
Electrodes